Churmaq (also Romanized as Chūrmaq; also known as Choormagh Mehraban) is a village in Mehraban-e Sofla Rural District, Gol Tappeh District, Kabudarahang County, Hamadan Province, Iran. At the 2006 census, its population was 340, in 79 families.

References 

Populated places in Kabudarahang County